Anweshichu Kandethiyilla is a 1967 Indian Malayalam-language film, directed by P. Bhaskaran and written by Parappurath. The film stars K. R. Vijaya, Sathyan and Madhu. Based on Parappurath's novel of the same name, it recounts the quest for happiness by a nurse with the best of intentions, but who is disillusioned. The film was made as a reply to the biblical homily, ‘seek and ye shall find’. Anweshichu Kandethiyilla won the National Film Award for Best Feature Film in Malayalam.

Plot

Cast 

Sathyan as Thomas
K. R. Vijaya as Susamma
Madhu as Antony
Sukumari as Savithri
Kaviyoor Ponnamma as Annie's mother
Adoor Bhasi as Korappachayan
Thikkurissy Sukumaran Nair as Ummachan
Kottayam Santha as Cheriyamma
P. J. Antony as Unnunnichayan
T. S. Muthaiah as Tharakan
Bahadoor as Vaidyar
G. K. Pillai as Thommachan
Mavelikkara Ponnamma
 Aranmula Ponnamma
Meena as Annamma
Nellikode Bhaskaran as Kunju Krishnan Nambiar
Panjabi as Cheriyachan
Santha Devi
Junior Sheela as Karthi
Vijayanirmala as Annie
Sathyan as Thomas

Soundtrack 
The music was composed by M. S. Baburaj, with lyrics by P. Bhaskaran.

References

External links 
 

1960s Malayalam-language films
1967 films
Best Malayalam Feature Film National Film Award winners
Films based on Indian novels
Films directed by P. Bhaskaran
Films scored by M. S. Baburaj